DiBella Winery is a winery in Woolwich Township in Gloucester County, New Jersey. A family produce and grain farm since 1925, the vineyard was first planted in 2002. DiBella began sales of its wine in 2010, and opened a tasting room in 2012. DiBella Winery has 4 acres of grapes under cultivation, and produces 250 cases of wine per year. The winery is named after the family that owns it.

Wines
DiBella Winery is located in the Outer Coastal Plain AVA, and produces wine from Cabernet Franc, Cabernet Sauvignon, Chardonnay, Merlot, Pinot gris, and Traminette grapes. DiBella also makes fruit wines from cherries and raspberries.

Licensing and associations
The winery is a member of the Garden State Wine Growers Association, but is not a member of the Outer Coastal Plain Vineyard Association.

See also 
Alcohol laws of New Jersey
American wine
Judgment of Princeton
List of wineries, breweries, and distilleries in New Jersey
New Jersey Farm Winery Act
New Jersey Wine Industry Advisory Council
New Jersey wine

References

External links 
Garden State Wine Growers Association

Wineries in New Jersey
Tourist attractions in Gloucester County, New Jersey
2010 establishments in New Jersey
Woolwich Township, New Jersey